Fairlee may refer to:

 Fairlee, Isle of Wight, England
 Fairlee, Maryland, United States
 Fairlee, Vermont, United States, a New England town
 Fairlee (CDP), Vermont, the main village in the town

See also
 
 Fairlie (disambiguation)